The  is a limited express train service between Asahikawa and Wakkanai in Hokkaido, Japan, which is operated by Hokkaido Railway Company (JR Hokkaido). Two trains per day operate in each direction, with the journey taking approximately 3 hours 45 minutes.

Stations
Trains stop at the following stations:

 -  -  -  -  -  -  -  -  -  -

Rolling stock

Services are normally formed of 4-car KiHa 261 series DMUs, with Car No. 1 at the Wakkanai end and Car No. 4 at the Asahikawa end. Car No. 1 consists of both ordinary-class seats and the Green Car, while the other cars are ordinary-class cars. All seats are non-smoking. Up until 2007, an additional  was attached to the train during busy seasons.

History
One of the Sōya services changed its name to Sarobetsu on July 1, 1992. However, the Sarobetsu service had no green cars, in contrast to Sōya, and stopped at these stations:
 -  -  -  -   -  -  -  -  -  -  -  -  -  -  -  - 

The Sarobetsu service was suspended, as the KiHa 183 series, which was the same type of train used for the service at that time, was involved in a fire on the Hakodate Main Line in July 2013. The service was supposed to resume the following month, but was delayed due to the accident investigation and resulting preventative measures. The suspension ended on March 31, 2014. In the meantime, a temporary rapid train service replaced the Sarobetsu.

From the start of the revised timetable of 4 March 2017, the Sarobetsu service was re-routed to operate between Asahikawa and Wakkanai, when the Lilac was introduced between Sapporo and Asahikawa. Also, the KiHa 261 series sets were used to replace the ageing KiHa 183 series sets.

References

External links
 Sarobetsu information on JR Hokkaido official website  

Hokkaido Railway Company
Named passenger trains of Japan
Railway services introduced in 1992

ja:サロベツ (列車)